Keith Charles Bishop (born 11 March 1949) is a former English cricketer.  Bishop was a right-handed batsman who bowled right-arm medium pace.  He was born in Bury St Edmunds, Suffolk.

Bishop made his debut for Suffolk in a List A match debut against Buckinghamshire in the 1979 Gillette Cup.  In this match, he took the wicket of Keith Edwards for the cost of 27 runs from 12 overs, while with the bat he ended the Suffolk innings unbeaten on 0, with Suffolk winning the match by 2 wickets.  He played a further List A match, which came in the 1980 Gillette Cup against Sussex.  In this match, he scored 3 unbeaten runs, while he wasn't required to bat.  He didn't feature in Minor counties cricket for Suffolk.

His son, Justin, played first-class cricket for Essex and Durham UCCE, as well as List A and Minor counties cricket for Suffolk.

References

External links
Keith Bishop at ESPNcricinfo
Keith Bishop at CricketArchive

1949 births
Living people
Sportspeople from Bury St Edmunds
English cricketers
Suffolk cricketers